Nimitz is an unincorporated community in Summers County, West Virginia, United States.  It lies along West Virginia Route 3 to the west of the city of Hinton, the county seat of Summers County.   Its elevation is 2,523 feet (769 m).  It has a post office with the ZIP code 25978.

References

Unincorporated communities in Summers County, West Virginia
Unincorporated communities in West Virginia